The Design 1020 ship (full name Emergency Fleet Corporation Design 1020) was a steel-hulled cargo ship design approved for mass production by the United States Shipping Boards Emergency Fleet Corporation (EFT) in World War I.

They were referred to as the "Laker"-type. Production was spread out over ten shipyards, the majority of which were owned by American Ship Building Company
American Ship Building Company (21 ships), 10 at their Cleveland, Ohio shipyard and 11 at their Lorain, Ohio shipyard;
Superior Shipbuilding Company (ASBC) (6 ships) at their Superior, Wisconsin shipyard; 
Buffalo Shipbuilding Company (ASBC)  (5 ships) at their Buffalo, New York shipyard; 
Chicago Shipbuilding Company (ASBC) (9 ships) at their Chicago, Illinois shipyard;
Detroit Shipbuilding Company (ASBC) (15 ships) at their Wyandotte, Michigan shipyard; 
Globe Shipbuilding Company (6 ships) at their Superior, Wisconsin shipyard; 
McDougall Duluth Shipbuilding Company (10 ships) at their Duluth, Minnesota shipyard; 
Saginaw Shipbuilding Company (12 ships) at their Saginaw, Michigan shipyard; and 
Toledo Shipbuilding Company (8 ships) at their Toledo, Ohio shipyard.

92 ships were completed for the USSB in 1918 and 1919. Engines were coal-fueled triple expansion engines.

References

Bibliography

External links
 EFC Design 1020: Illustrations

Standard ship types of the United States
Design 1020 ships
Design 1020 ships of the United States Navy